Riccardo Ragni (born 23 June 1991) is an Italian footballer who plays as a goalkeeper.

Club career
Ragni started his career at amateur side Mosciano, in Mosciano Sant'Angelo, Abruzzo region. In 2009, he joined the under-20 team of Abruzzese club Pescara but in January 2010 left Pescara without any appearance, for Chieti of Serie D. In 2010–11 Serie D season he was the member of Ebolitana.

After  seasons Ragni became a borderline member of the first team of Pescara, which Ragni wore no.76 shirt in pre-season 2011.

On 6 August 2011 his employment contract was sold to Andria on a co-ownership deal for €70,000, but on 31 January 2012 returned to Pescara on a temporary deal and in August in a definitive deal for €37,500 fee, signing a 2-year contract. Ragni was immediately left for Nocerina.

Ragni received pre-season call-up from Pescara on 9 July 2013. However he left for Aprilia before round 1.

On 21 August 2014 Ragni signed an initial 1-year contract with Ascoli.

Ragni remained in his home province club for  seasons, renewing contract at the start of each season. 

On 30 January 2018 Ragni left for Alessandria until the end of season, with Michael Agazzi moved to Ascoli. Ragni was assigned number 22 shirt. Ragni made one league appearance for his new club before released by the club on 30 June 2018.

References

External links
 
 
 Abruzzocalciodilettanti profile
 
 2015–16 season profile by La Gazzetta dello Sport 
 Profile by Italian Footballers' Association and football.it 

1991 births
People from San Benedetto del Tronto
Sportspeople from the Province of Ascoli Piceno
Living people
Italian footballers
Association football goalkeepers
Delfino Pescara 1936 players
S.S. Chieti Calcio players
S.S. Ebolitana 1925 players
S.S. Fidelis Andria 1928 players
A.S.G. Nocerina players
Ascoli Calcio 1898 F.C. players
Serie B players
Serie C players
Serie D players
Footballers from Marche